This is a complete filmography for actor Christopher Reeve.

Film

Television

Television films

Television series

Theater

Broadway
The Marriage of Figaro
Fifth of July
A Matter of Gravity

West End
The Aspern Papers (London)

Off-Broadway
The Winter's Tale
My Life

Regional
The Guardsman
Death Takes a Holiday
Love Letters (Boston, Los Angeles, San Francisco)
Richard Cory
The Greeks
Summer and Smoke
The Cherry Orchard
The Front Page
Camino Real
Holiday
The Royal Family
John Brown's Body
Troilus and Cressida
The Way of the World
The Firebugs
The Plow and the Stars
The Devil's Disciple
As You Like It
Richard III
The Merry Wives of Windsor
Love's Labour's Lost
South Pacific
Finian's Rainbow
The Music Man
Galileo

Video games
9: The Last Resort (1996) Thurston The Last Big F*ck (voice)

Male actor filmographies
American filmographies